Matt Pinto is the radio voice for the Oklahoma City Thunder for WWLS-FM 98.1, the flagship station for the Thunder Radio Network. He formerly served as the radio play-by-play voice for the Seattle SuperSonics for KTTH-AM 770, the flagship station for the Sonics Radio Network. He was previously named as the radio voice of the Los Angeles Clippers for KSPN-AM (710 ESPN, Los Angeles) on August 24, 2005, and he would work at least 70 games a year, while the regular television announcing team of Ralph Lawler and Michael Smith would work the remaining 12 games on radio only. He was replaced by Minnesota Timberwolves radio man Brian Sieman in 2007.

Previously, he spent eight years doing radio and television coverage for the Dallas Mavericks, the first four exclusively on radio and the other four exclusively for television.  While in Dallas, he often referred to players as "water bugs" on plays in which they were driving to the basket.  He worked alongside Bob Ortegel during his television career in Dallas.

From 1990 through 1996, Pinto was also the radio voice of the Charlotte Hornets. Before that he was a sports anchor for KGMB-TV, the CBS affiliate station in Honolulu.

References
 Los Angeles Clippers broadcaster bio
 Sieman replaces Matt Pinto

Living people
Charlotte Hornets announcers
Dallas Mavericks announcers
Los Angeles Clippers announcers
Oklahoma City Thunder announcers
Seattle SuperSonics announcers
Year of birth missing (living people)
National Basketball Association broadcasters